Lake Paradise  may refer to:
Australia
Lake Paradise (Queensland), a reservoir in the North Burnett Region
New Zealand
Lake Paradise (Canterbury), a lake in Canterbury, New Zealand
Lake Paradise (Fiordland), a lake in Fiordland National Park, New Zealand
United States of America
Lake Paradise (Arkansas), a lake in Chicot County, Arkansas
Lake Paradise (Illinois), a reservoir in Illinois, United States
Lake Paradise (Michigan), a lake in Michigan, United States

See also
Paradise Lake (disambiguation)
Paradise Dam (disambiguation)